Doctor Mist is a fictional superhero published by DC Comics. He was created by E. Nelson Bridwell and Ramona Fradon, first appearing in a cameo in Super Friends #12 (June–July 1978). 

Hailing from the mythical realm of Kor, Nommo was a powerful mystic who acted as both king of the African realm and guardian of a source of magic known as the "Mystic Flame of Life". After an encounter with Felix Faust robbed him much of his mystic might and he was cast out for his failure, he walked the earth with minor sorcerous powers and immortality. Seeking a mate to offset his loneliness, he nurtured his fellow Homo magi race over the centuries to create the perfect mate and began his superhero career, leading the Global Guardians. With his former plan of nurturing the ultimate mate culminated in the form of Zatanna Zatara, he instead abandoned it upon feeling guilt over his infatuation and deceptive influence and instead remained a mystic super-hero.

After the events of Flashpoint, a new version of Doctor Mist appeared; named Nommo Balewa, he was a doctor in South Africa who was widowed after losing his wife to a civil war. Immersing himself in the mystic arts of his ancestors, the Homo magi, he christened himself "Doctor Mist" and attempted to resurrect his dead wife to no avail. Although this version initially began his career in modern times, later stories revised his background, restoring his original connection to the African realm of Kor and the founding of the Global Guardians.  

Nommo has made some appearances in media, most notably in the 2014 television series Constantine by Charles Parnell.

Publication history
Doctor Mist has appeared in the pages of Super Friends, DC Comics Presents, Infinity, Inc., Justice League International, Justice League Quarterly, Blue Beetle and Primal Force.

Fictional character biography

Origin
Nommo, the wizard-king of the African empire of Kor, stood in the Pillar of Life and was endowed with immortality. He later took the name Doctor Mist.

Global Guardians (Pre-Crisis)
Doctor Mist gathers a number of international heroes to help the Super Friends battle the Conqueror. Later, Superman teams with several international heroes at Doctor Mist's request. He is the one who first gives them the name the Global Guardians. Superman and several of the Guardians would team up to fight against the threat of Thaumar Dhai and the squad of powerful wizards who worship him. Dhai was defeated when his objects of power turned out to be Superman-created fakeries. The team later fights against the Shadow Demons in the Crisis on Infinite Earths. Most of the Pre-Crisis history of the Global Guardians is no longer in the mainstream continuity of the DC Comics universe.

Global Guardians (Post-Crisis)
In 1957, the newly formed European Economic Community established the Dome, a supra-national police organization. At some later point Doctor Mist formed the Global Guardians to serve as a task force for the Dome.

Decades later, the Dome lost its funding when, in part because of the political machinations of Dr. Klaus Cornelius, the United Nations decided to close the Dome and instead fund the new Justice League International. The Global Guardians then fractured with Doctor Mist and his assistant Belphegor, disappearing. Queen Bee of Bialya rebuilt the Dome in her country. She then brainwashed the Global Guardians into her service also creating an android Doctor Mist to lead the team.

Later on, Doctor Mist reappeared and helped Guardian members Jack O'Lantern and Owlwoman escape Bialya. Doctor Mist recruited a team to free the rest of the Guardians from Bialya mind control and then reformed the Global Guardians, building a new Dome headquarters somewhere in the Pacific.

Primal Force
An eternal, Mist's physical body was slain by an ancient force. Nonetheless, he did turn up alive and seemingly well after the Zero Hour crisis. At this time, calling himself Maltis, he formed a new team of heroes known as the Leymen. The group was short-lived. Maltis' time on the team even shorter as he had a heart attack soon after the team formed. Later, he was seemingly killed after being thrown into a pool of acid by the evil Mordru.

The New 52
In The New 52 reboot of DC's continuity (launched in 2011), Steve Trevor first mentions Mist as a government operative, having a hand in watching the Black Room, a secretive government vault where mystical artifacts are stored. Trevor sends the Justice League Dark to rescue Mist after he is captured while infiltrating Felix Faust's cult in South America. Mist appears to have an existing friendship with Black Orchid, one of Trevor's other magical operatives. Mist was revealed to work for Faust all along, as Mist sends a magical blast straight into John Constantine's brain. Mist had been a double agent all along, designed to get Faust into the Black Room. In the end, Faust had promised to return Mist's deceased wife back to him.

Powers and abilities
In his original incarnation, Doctor Mist once held formidable power from the Stone of Life, bolstering his sorcerous powers and could perform magical feats such as object transmutation, teleportation, and cast illusions as well as immortality. After losing much power from the Flame of Life, he retained only a small connection to it, giving him minor magical powers compared to before, and retained his immortality. At the height of his power, he was considered a match for Felix Faust's original power though when deprived much of his might, he recognized himself to be inferior to the likes of a sorceress Zatanna Zatara. To accommodate for his waned power, he would use his magical abilities carefully to portray himself more mysterious and powerful than he really was. In addition to his mystic abilities, he was a capable hand-to-hand combatant. 

The more recent versions of Doctor Mist retains his immortality but possess the natural ability to initiate magic at a more formidable level sufficient enough to reflect the backwards-casting spells cast by Zatanna Zatara. He could also perform other magical feats including creating bolts of magical lightning, create wards, and teleport.

In other media

Television 
 Doctor Mist, under his real name Nommo, appears in the Constantine episode "A Feast of Friends", portrayed by Charles Parnell. He is depicted as a shaman who helps John track a hunger demon by entering a hallucinogenic state using a drug called "mist". After the hunger demon Mnemoth began a rampage, John Constantine contacted Nommo to find a way to defeat it. They used the strong psychedelic drug The Mist to trace its origins, before Nommo gave Constantine and himself the Nectar of Nhialic to counteract the trip.
 Doctor Mist made a cameo in the Powerless NBC series, appearing on a magazine cover of a fictional company known as "Phenom".

See also
 African characters in comics

References

External links
 DCU Guide: Doctor Mist
 DCU Guide: Doctor Mist chronology

Comics characters introduced in 1978
DC Comics male superheroes
DC Comics fantasy characters
DC Comics characters who use magic
DC Comics characters who can teleport 
Fictional characters with elemental transmutation abilities
Fictional characters with immortality
Fictional characters with electric or magnetic abilities